Harry Melville may refer to:

 Harry Melville (chemist) (1908–2000), British chemist and academic administrator
 Harry Melville (rugby league) (1930–1965), Australian rugby league player

See also
 Henry Melville (disambiguation)
 Melville (name)